Cyrus Christopher Lawrence (November 15, 1960 – September 2, 2022) was the tailback for the Virginia Tech Hokies football team from 1979 until 1982.  He finished his career at Tech as the school's all-time lead rusher, with a career total of 3,767 yards.  Lawrence held the school's single-season rushing record of 1,403 yards until this mark was broken in 2003 by Kevin Jones.  His accomplishments at Tech led to his induction into the school's sports hall of fame. 

In the 1981 Peach Bowl against the Miami Hurricanes, Lawrence scored the Hokies' only touchdown.

Lawrence passed away on September 2, 2022.

External links
 http://www.hokiesports.com/football/bowls/1981Peach.html - recap of 1981 Peach Bowl

1960 births
Living people
American football running backs
Virginia Tech Hokies football players
Place of birth missing (living people)